Vũ Xuân Cường (born 6 August 1992) is a Vietnamese footballer who plays as a centre-back for V-League club Thanh Hóa

Honours

Club
Đông Á Thanh Hóa
Vietnamese National Cup:
 Third place : 2022

External links 
 
 

Vietnamese footballers
Association football central defenders
V.League 1 players
Vietnam international footballers
1992 births
Living people
People from Thanh Hóa province
Dong Thap FC players
Thanh Hóa FC players